Research in Sports Medicine is a quarterly peer-reviewed medical journal covering sports medicine. It was established in 1988 as Sports Medicine, Training and Rehabilitation, obtaining its current title in 2003. The journal is published by Routledge and the editor-in-chiefs are  Youlian Hong (Chengdu Sports University) and Lars R. McNaughton.

Abstracting and indexing
The journal is abstracted and indexed in:

According to the Journal Citation Reports, the journal has a 2017 impact factor of 1.871.

References

External links

Routledge academic journals
Quarterly journals
Publications established in 1988
English-language journals
Sports medicine journals